Salman Kandi (also Romanized as Salmān Kandī) is a village in Guzal Darreh Rural District, Soltaniyeh District, Abhar County, Zanjan Province, Iran. At the 2006 census, its population was 416, in 100 families.

References 

Populated places in Abhar County